Michael Zarnock (born April 21, 1958 in Utica, New York) is an American writer of collector guides and articles about Hot Wheels toy cars and accessories. Zarnock is known for a massive Hot Wheels collection that earned him a Guinness World Record title in 2003 and 2007 for owning the largest collection of different model cars (8,128) and is featured in the 2008 "Ripley's Believe It or Not!" book Prepare to Be Shocked. And the 2011 "Ripley's Believe It Or Not!" book "Utterly Crazy!" By his own account he has collected more than 20,000 toy cars; From 2004 to 2010 some had been on display at the Children's Museum of Utica, New York. The local Utica newspaper reported Zarnock as saying: "I’ve been in love with Hot Wheels since 1968."
 
In February 2009 Zarnock was inducted into the Diecast Hall of Fame and later that year Mattel Hot Wheels reproduced his altered roadster racing car as part of their nostalgic "Drag Strip Demons" series.

Life and work 
Born into a working-class family, Zarnock worked 45 hours a week as an auto mechanic while attending John F. Kennedy High School in Utica, New York, where he graduated in 1976. As a teenager he raced Motocross; while still in high school he built and drove show cars and drag cars. Some of the drag cars were used by other people for illegal street races; Zarnock claims that at one such unsanctioned street race he was kidnapped for a time. This story made its way all the way out to Los Angeles where he was asked to write it as a screenplay for actor–producer Christopher Titus. Zarnock later rewrote the script for publication as a novel.

Zarnock lives in Deerfield, New York with his wife Tina and youngest son Cody. His elder son, Christopher, lives in Frederick, Maryland and is also a Hot Wheels collector and Customizer.

Zarnock's is the author of the Ultimate Guide to Hot Wheels Variations Krause, now out of print after two printings (2002 and 2003). He has subsequently written 12 more books and contributed chapters on Hot Wheels collecting for the Standard Catalog of Die-Cast Vehicles II & III and six editions of Toys & Prices.

Zarnock has appeared at schools, conventions, toy shows and Hot Wheels club functions across the United States and Canada, and has also appeared in movies. He made his screen debut in several independent films written by David Dellecese, playing Artie, a sleazy comic book publisher, in the film Detour. He later portrayed talk show host Freddy Grecko in The Death of Daniel Whately and Chester Greenfield II, the wealthy father of the villain in Anchor Eddy's.

Works

2011–Present - Contributing Editor "Die Cast X Magazine" (Hot Wheels Highway Section)
2009-2010 - Associate Editor "The Car Room Magazine" (Monthly Hot Wheels Column)
2008-2009 - "Die Cast X Magazine" (Monthly Hot Wheels Column)
2002 to 2008 - "Toy Cars & Models Magazine ." (Monthly Column and Hot Wheels Variation Price Guide)
2002 - "The Ultimate Guide to Hot Wheels Variations"
Die-Cast Vehicles II" (Hot Wheels Collector Number chapters)
2003 - "Warman's Hot Wheels . Field Guide"
2004 - "Hot Wheels Variations, The Ultimate Guide, 2nd Edition"
2004 - "Toys & Prices - 11th Edition". (Hot Wheels Collector Number chapters)
2005 - "Hot Wheels Accessories, The Ultimate Guide"
2005 - "Toys & Prices - 12th Edition". (Hot Wheels Collector Number chapters)
2005 - "The Standard Catalog of Die-Cast Vehicles III", (Hot Wheels Collector Number chapters)
2006 - "Hot Wheels: A Warman's Companion Guide"
2006 - "Toys & Prices - 13th Edition". (Hot Wheels Collector Number chapters)
2007 - "Hot Wheels Variations, The Ultimate Guide 3rd Edition"
2007 - "Toys & Prices - 14th Edition". (Hot Wheels Collector Number chapters)
2007 - "Warman's Hot Wheels Field Guide 2nd Edition"
2008 - "Toys & Prices - 15th Edition". (Hot Wheels Collector Number chapters)
2009 - "Toys & Prices - 16th Edition". (Hot Wheels Collector Number chapters)
2009 - "Hot Wheels: A Warman's Companion Guide 2nd Edition"
2009 - "Once Upon A Street Race" (Based on the true story of the time Mike got kidnapped at a street race!)
2010 - "Hot Wheels Variations, The Ultimate Guide 4th. Edition"
2010 - "Warman's Hot Wheels Field Guide 3rd Edition"
2011 - "Hot Wheels Prototypes" (Bruce Pascal & Michael Zarnock)
2012 - "Warman's Hot Wheels Field Guide 4th Edition"
2014 - "Hot Wheels Variations 2000-2013 Identification & Price Guide"

Filmography 

2004 – Detour-"Catch Your Breath Productions"
2005 - The Death of Daniel Whately-"Catch Your Breath Productions"
2006 - Anchor Eddy's-"Catch Your Breath Productions"

Notes

External links

Zarnock's website
Zarnock's Facebook Fan Page on Facebook
Hot Wheels Collection at the Children's Museum, Utica, NY
Zarnock's YouTube Channel
Podcast interview with Michael Zarnock
"Ask Michael" Hot Wheels related questions at "All Experts.com"
Clip of Zarnock from  "The Death of Daniel Whatley"
Anchor Eddy's movie trailer
News interview with Mike Zarnock about his feature in Ripley's Believe It or Not!
News Interview with Mike Zarnock about "The Car Room Magazine Internet TV Show"

1958 births
American male film actors
Living people
American podcasters
Writers from Utica, New York
Hot Wheels
People from Deerfield, New York